Angas may refer to:

Places 
Angas, Iran, a village in Mazandaran Province, Iran
Division of Angas (1903–1934), in Australia
Division of Angas (1949–1977), in Australia
Electoral district of Angas, in Australia
River Angas, in Australia
Angas Downs Indigenous Protected Area, in Australia

Other uses 
Angas, a junior synonym for the moth genus now known as Actias
Angas (surname)
Angas people, an ethnic group of Nigeria
Angas language, spoken in Nigeria
Angas, inhabitants of the ancient Indian kingdom of Anga
Jain Angas, subdivisions of Jain sacred texts

See also
Anga (disambiguation)